Christos Melissis, (born 1 December 1982) is a Greek football player who played for Sudanese club Al-Hilal Omdurman. He has played in the past for Naoussa, Panserraikos, PAOK, Panathinaikos, Larissa, Panthrakikos, Marítimo in Portugal and the Greece national football team. He usually plays as a center back but when called upon he is used as a right back or a defensive midfielder.

Playing career
He started his career in Naoussa, and then played for five years in Panserraikos before attracting the interesting of PAOK. He was signed by PAOK Thessaloniki FC in January 2006 and has become an important first team player ever since. He scored his first goal for PAOK in a home game versus Aris FC in 2007.

In the last games of the 2007–08 season he was named captain of the PAOK Thessaloniki FC squad, indicating his role for the years to come and rewarding his commitment. He is very good in air, with good technique.

On 28 July 2008 he was transferred from PAOK to Panathinaikos for a fee of 2,000,000 € plus Filippos Darlas. He played in 11 games of the team's 2008–09 season but his appearances were not convincing and on 31 August 2009 he was loaned to AEL for one year, making a total of 29 appearances and scoring 1 goal.

On 31 September 2010, Melissis completed a loan move to the Portuguese Club Sport Marítimo, but failed to make a single appearance for the club. On 19 January 2011, he rejoined his old club Larissa on loan.

After having not appeared in a single league game for Panathinaikos during the 2011–12 season, Melissis left the club after his contract ran out in June 2012.

In summer 2013, Melissis signed a contract with Olympiakos Volou 1937 F.C. He made his debut against Glyfada F.C. and he scored his first goal against Fostiras F.C. in a 5–1 home win. In January 2015, he signed a 1,5-year contract with Panthrakikos returning to Super League after a year. On 11 January 2015, he debuted with the club in a 1–1 home draw against Atromitos. On 28 November 2015, he scored in a surprise away victory for Panthrakikos, its first at 2015-16 season against Atromitos helping his club to escape with a 2–1 win.

On 24 June 2016, Melissis signed a one-year contract with Superleague side Veria F.C.

On 26 October 2017, Melissis signed a two-years contract with Sudanese club Al-Hilal Omdurman

International career
He was called to the Greece national football team for the first time on 1 February 2008, and made his debut against the Czech Republic on 5 February. He was recalled to the national team for a friendly against Cyprus and so on 19 May 2008, he earned his second cap coming on as a second-half substitute.

References

External links
 

1982 births
Living people
Greek footballers
Greece international footballers
Greek expatriate footballers
PAOK FC players
Panathinaikos F.C. players
Panserraikos F.C. players
Athlitiki Enosi Larissa F.C. players
Naoussa F.C. players
C.S. Marítimo players
Veria F.C. players
Greek expatriates in Portugal
Super League Greece players
Association football central defenders
Footballers from Edessa, Greece